is a Japanese manga series written and illustrated by Osamu Tezuka. It was serialized in Sanrio's  manga magazine  from November 1976 to March 1979 and collected in two volumes. A pilot film for a potential television series was produced in 1979. Two theatrical anime film adaptations were produced by Tezuka Productions and Madhouse in the early 1980s.

The series follows Unico, a baby unicorn with white fur, a pink mane, and cinnamon bun-shaped ears, who was born with the gift of making all living creatures lighthearted and happy. Unico's friends in the various manga and anime incarnations of the story include Beezle, the young Devil of Solitude; Chao (or "Katy" in the English release of the anime), a naive little kitty who longs to be a human girl and to learn magic from a real witch; a spunky little sphinx (in the second anime film); and a warm-hearted girl named Cheri.

Plot 
Unico is a young, innocent male unicorn who possesses a special ability to bring happiness to anyone near him. The story begins in ancient Greece with a young mortal girl named Psyche. She is the first friend to Unico, and is apparently so beautiful that the goddess Venus becomes jealous. The goddess attributes Psyche's beauty to her happiness and decides to remove the magical creature. A series of trickery takes place and leads to the kidnapping of poor Unico. Once the goddess Venus has Unico, she calls upon the second star, Zephyrus, later known as the "West Wind" in the film adaptation. The West Wind is commanded to take Unico through space and time, to the Hill of Oblivion with no memories of Psyche.

In the 1981 film adaptation, The Fantastic Adventures of Unico, the gods believe that only they should have the ability to control others' emotions and decide that Unico must die. However, the gods feel that punishment may be too harsh and instead choose to send the West Wind to capture Unico and take him to the Hill of Oblivion.

The West Wind takes pity on Unico and declines to follow the gods' commands. The gods are furious when they learn of the West Wind's defiance, and send the Night Wind to capture Unico. This is when the real adventures begin.

To protect Unico from the gods, the West Wind must continually transport the little unicorn. Whenever Unico makes friends and brings happiness to others, the gods are alerted to Unico's whereabouts, so the West Wind appears to spirit him away, yet he is unable to say goodbye to his new friends. Once again his memory is taken and a new adventure begins again.

Characters

 (1979 short film), Katsue Miwa (1981 and 1983 animated films), Barbara Goodson (English dubs for 1981 and 1983 feature films), Akiko Yajima (2000), Rumiko Tezuka ("Dr. Pinoko's Forest Adventures"), Haruna Kawai (Kemono Friends 3)
 A baby unicorn that has the ability to spread happiness to everyone. Due to angering the gods over his ability to spread happiness and love, Unico ends up frequently getting his memories erased by The West Wind and is taken from place to place or a different timeline and dimension to escape from The Night Wind and alerting the gods. He also has the ability to temporarily transform into "The Mighty Unicorn" when somebody truly loves him.

Unico is very kindhearted, compassionate, and very empathic with others which even extends to antagonists and villains he encounters in the original manga and other appearances media. When confronting certain antagonists (such as Kuruku), Unico would typically avoid attacking them by flying away or thinking of a non-violent approach (such as having a peaceful conversation or talking them down) but sometimes uses violence (such as stabbing them with his horn) as a final resort when none of his non-violent solutions works.

Tezuka's earlier illustrations of Unico depicted him with black or dark pink colored hair/mane alongside his body being colored white or blue. His mouth area would also be colored white. In later appearances, his mane would be colored red instead of pink and his entire face was colored blue. His pupils was also originally colored orange, but was later changed to blue/green beginning with the film series by Sanrio. Unico's hair in the original manga, 2000 short film, and "Unico: AWAKENING" resembled actual hair from horse but was later changed to looking like human hair beginning in 1979 and became his default design in 2005. Unico is also frequently depicted wearing eyeliner (usually colored pink, orange, or yellow) and sometimes seen wearing a bow around his horn.

 (1981 film), Robin Levenson (English dub of the 1981 film)
 A black and white cat who debuted in the manga chapter "The Cat in The Broomstick" who dreams of becoming a cat witch for humans to respect her after getting abandoned. Chao befriends Unico after the titular unicorn accidentally falls into her basket (which is actually her home) floating down a river. After developing a close relationship with an Old Lady (whom she mistakes as a real witch), Unico secretly grants her wish to become a human girl but is very temporary. Chao permanently becomes a human after she rescues an The Old Lady from drowning with Unico's help. 

In the original manga, her dress was colored black and wore red shoes after her original cat form. In the 1981 film, her dress was changed to pink and wore red shoes. Her hair color was originally black but was changed to blue in the 1981 feature film. In "Unico: AWAKENING", she is given whiskers in her cat form and wears a red bow around her neck and renamed "Chloe".

 (1981 film), Cheryl Chase (English dub of the 1981 movie)
 A young imp/demon and the son of Lucifer who's bratty and very demanding when it comes to playing with Unico. Beezle refuses to become Unico's friend unless he gives him his horn. Unico allows Beezle to have his horn but promises Beezle to return before the end of the day. After roughhousing with Unico, he causes the foal to fall down the ocean causing Beezle to risk his life rescuing Unico due to water being poisonous with demons. He is later given his own horn by Unico after he tells that he saved him out of love (which Beezle doesn't believe at first).

 (1983 film), Lara Cody (English dub of the 1983 movie)
 A young female lioness/sphinx and the daughter of "Sphinx" from the original manga that also appears in the 1983 feature film "Unico in the Island of Magic". She has green colored hair and her entire body being yellow (sometimes depicted with orange in other appearances). In the 1983 movie, Unico and Cheri first encounter her after searching for her mother from a group of crying demon babies. While her mother wasn't present, Marusu becomes Unico's ally to help defeat Kuruku and freeing everybody from their puppet forms.

While very short-tempered and calls Unico "bonehead", she's very sweet and friendly when it comes to Unico feeling sad. Such as telling him that Cheri left him behind out of love so Unico won't have to suffer the same fate as her parents.

 A young female unicorn and the older sister of Unico from the original manga. She has a similar appearance as Unico but is given a more feminine design. She has yellow colored hair and white body and wears yellow eyeliner. Corn is also seen holding a heart-shaped rose in her mouth.

Media

Manga 
Written by Osamu Tezuka, Unico was serialized in Sanrio's  manga magazine  (Lyrica) from November 1976 to March 1979. Its chapters were collected in two volumes published by Sanrio. The manga was re-published by Shogakukan in 1984 in a learning magazine for children.

In 2012, Digital Manga Publishing successfully funded a Kickstarter to publish the manga in full-color in English. The company launched a second Kickstarter to reprint the manga in 2015.

In Spring 2022, Tezuka Productions, along with illustrator duo Gurihiru and writer Samuel Sattin, launched an international Kickstarter campaign to fund a new manga titled Unico: Awakening (ユニコ: 目覚めのおはなし, Unico: Awakening Story). Described as a "re-imagining", the 162-page manga is based on "The Cat on the Broomstick" storyline from the original Unico manga. The campaign was fully funded before it turned 24 hours old. 

As part of the Kickstarter campaign, an American mini-comic titled "Unico" by Steenz and American picture book by Madeline Copp were created for backers of the project under the "Unico: Awakening Artifacts" series. Which was a limited edition collectibles created by American cartoonists and artists.

Anime

Unico: Black Cloud, White Feather 
In 1979, the same year the manga ended, Unico made his animated debut in Kuroi Kumo Shiroi Hane (Black Cloud, White Feather), an ecologically-themed pilot film (for a proposed anime television series) which was later released directly to video. In the pilot, Unico meets a young girl named Chiko in Canada who is ill because of the pollution from a nearby factory, and becomes determined to save Chiko's life by destroying the factory in order to cure her. Unico was voiced in this film by Hiroya Oka and Rocío Banquells in the Spanish dub in 1980.

The Fantastic Adventures of Unico 
Although the TV series was not picked up, Unico was adapted into two feature-length anime films produced by Sanrio and Tezuka Productions with animation by Madhouse Studios.

The first movie, titled The Fantastic Adventures of Unico in English and simply Unico in Japan, was released in Japanese theaters on March 14, 1981, in Mexico on Canal de las Estrellas on September 27, 1982, and direct-to-video in the United States by RCA Columbia Pictures Home Video on May 12, 1983. This musical film, narrated by singer–songwriter Iruka, directed by Toshio Hirata, and written by Masaki Tsuji, with animation by Yoshiaki Kawajiri, presents the back story of Unico's banishment by the gods and his subsequent travels, as well as his friendships with Beezle (to whom he grants his own horn) and Chao/Katy (to whom he grants the wish of becoming a human girl).

Beezle the Devil (known as "Akuma-kun", or "Little Devil", in the original version) initially rejects Unico's overtures of friendship, but comes around when he realizes how lonely he really is. After Beezle saves Unico from drowning, the two begin their friendship in earnest, but then the West Wind comes to take Unico away so he will not be discovered.

The next creature Unico encounters is Chao (Katy), a black-and-white cat who dreams of becoming a witch. Katy and Unico befriend a lonely old woman, whom Katy mistakenly believes is a witch and will teach her some magic as well as transform her into a human girl. When Unico changes Katy into a girl, Katy at first believes that the old woman did it, until Unico proves it was his doing by changing her back into a cat; but Unico, seeing how selfish Katy has become, refuses to change Katy back to a girl, until one day when Katy saves the old woman from drowning. Katy then becomes entranced by a man posing as a lord ("Danshaku" in Japanese, "Baron de Ghost" in English). He invites her to his castle, gets her drunk and attempts to seduce her. Unico follows, rescuing Katy (with help from Beezle) after transforming into a majestic white winged unicorn and destroying the demonic monster that the "lord" had transformed into. Afterwards, the West Wind comes to take Unico away again, and Katy moves in with the old woman.

This movie includes several songs, most of which were performed by the movie's narrators, Iruka in the original version, Joan-Carol O'Connell in the English dub, and Rocío Banquells in the Spanish dub; however, Chao/Katy's recurring theme song, Chao no Kuroneko no Uta (The Song of Black Cat Chao), was sung by Chao's voice actresses, Kazuko Sugiyama in the Japanese version, Robin Levenson in the English dub, and Liliana Abud in the Spanish dub. The movie's other songs include Unico no Teemu (Unico's Theme), Hontou wa Subishikute/Lonely (Beezle/Akuma-kun's image song), and Majo Neko Chao (Witch Cat Chao)/Katy The Kitty Witch, all sung by Iruka, O'Connell or Banquells. For the US release, all of the songs were dubbed into English along with the spoken dialogue, except for the ending song over the closing credits, which is an instrumental in the English version. Unico was voiced by Katsue Miwa in the original version, Barbara Goodson in the English dub, and Helena Rojo in the Spanish dub.

Unico in the Island of Magic 
Moribi Murano (often miscredited as "Mami Sugino") directed the second movie, titled  in Japanese and Unico in the Island of Magic in English, which was released to Japanese theaters on July 16, 1983, five days before the release of the first Barefoot Gen movie, which used many of the same production staff. It was also released direct-to-video in the United States by RCA Columbia Pictures Home Video on November 10, 1983, and on Canal de las Estrellas in Mexico on January 30, 1988.

This film essentially picks up after The Fantastic Adventures of Unico with the West Wind dropping Unico off in a new location where the gods will be unable to locate him. The story begins with the West Wind erasing Unico's memory of the past events and he is left to once again fend for himself. Unico runs into a Heathcliff-like cat named Melvin Magnificat who is the apparent boss of the forest which Unico has stumbled upon. Later, Unico meets a kind-hearted young girl named Cheri (also spelled "Cherry", voiced by Sumi Shimamoto). Cheri's older brother, Toby (in Japanese, "Torubi", voiced by Shuichi Ikeda), is working for the evil Lord Kuruku (in Japanese, "Kukuruku"), who plans to turn all living creatures, animals and people alike, into unusual zombie-like beings called "Living Puppets" to be his slaves. Toby's job is to change people into Living Puppets and then lure the Living Puppets to Kuruku's fortress on Nightmare Island off the East Coast of Sweden in exchange for learning more of Kuruku's magic. His plan is to obey and serve until he learns enough to be the master, but fails to protect Cheri twice. Toby also takes on Melvin Magnificat ("Yamaneko" in Japanese) – who hates Unico because Unico "intruded" in "his" forest (the forest in which the West Wind left Unico) – as his assistant. After Cheri's parents and neighbors all get turned into Living Puppets, she and Unico team up to stop Kuruku.

Seeking advice from the Trojan Horse, Unico and Cheri learn that Kuruku is a puppet who was mistreated by his owners and discarded. He washed up at the Ends of the Earth – where all unwanted "junk" ends up eventually – and was brought to life with the power of 200 years of sunlight exposure, determined to take revenge on the human race. With help from the Sphinx's daughter (voiced by Noriko Tsukase; named "Marusu" in Japanese but not given a proper name in the English version), Unico – who realizes that Kuruku is really just a lonely, friendless creature – is able to break Kuruku's spell, but since Kuruku's hatred was the only thing that kept him alive, Kuruku dies, reverts to puppet form, and Cheri keeps him as a toy. Soon afterward, the West Wind finds Unico and spirits him away once again to avoid detection by the gods.

As with the first movie, the second movie's ending song (Do-Re-Mi-Fa Lullaby performed by Emiko Shiratori) became an instrumental in the Spanish and English dub. Katsue Miwa in the original version and Barbara Goodson in the English dub reprised their roles as Unico in this film, while Verónica Castro played Unico in the Spanish dub.

Saving Our Fragile Earth: Unico Special 
Saving Our Fragile Earth: Unico Special is a 2000 animated short starring Unico that was a Japanese–Chinese co-production. Unico is voiced by Aracely Arámbula in the Spanish dub, while Akiko Yajima voiced the character in the original Japanese version.

Voice cast

The Fantastic Adventures of Unico

Additional English Voices
 Ardwight Chamberlain (The Devil of Solitude)

Unico in the Island of Magic

Home media 
The 1981 and 1983 theatrical films were dubbed into English and received North American exposure through VHS releases in the mid-1980s and airings on the Disney Channel.

In 2012, Discotek Media released The Fantastic Adventures of Unico and Unico in the Island of Magic on DVD, with both the Japanese and English audio tracks. The 1979 Unico pilot film was featured as an English-subtitled extra on the Island of Magic DVD.

Discotek Media re-released The Fantastic Adventures of Unico and Unico in the Island of Magic on a double-feature DVD on April 29, 2014. The DVD did not contain the pilot. Discotek also released the Blu-ray versions of both films in 2014. Crunchyroll began streaming the films online in 2016, while RetroCrush began streaming them in 2020.

Other appearances 
Unico made cameo appearances in several episodes of the Black Jack TV series adapted from the Black Jack manga.

Unico also made an appearance in the Game Boy Advance game Astro Boy: Omega Factor, where he gives Astro Boy the ability to have a warm and tender talk with Dr. Tenma, his father. Unico also appears in the Astro Boy manga in a comic book. In the story, he is Dr. Foola's inspiration for a new robot: a mechanical unicorn.

Unico can also be seen in a brief cameo in Columns GB: Osamu Tezuka Characters for the Game Boy Color.

The Unico films (the pilot, Fantastic Adventures, and Island of Magic) were produced by Sanrio, so some of Sanrio's characters, such as Hello Kitty, Tuxedo Sam, and the Little Twin Stars, make cameo appearances in the films.

On February 18, 2021, Tezuka Productions and Kemono Friends collaborated to add Unico into the Japanese mobile game Kemono Friends 3 as a special DLC character. The titular character was given a humanized design and was depicted as a female.

Reception 
Writing for Anime News Network, Shaenon K. Garrity called Unico "a good-looking manga", saying the "artwork looks like a comic-book version of the prettiest Disney movie never made".

See also 

 List of Osamu Tezuka anime
 List of Osamu Tezuka manga
 Osamu Tezuka's Star System

Further reading

References

External links 
 Unico on Osamu Tezuka's official website
 

1976 manga
1979 anime films
1981 anime films
1983 anime films
1980s children's animated films
1981 fantasy films
Animated films based on manga
Classical mythology in anime and manga
Digital Manga Publishing titles
Discotek Media
Fictional unicorns
Films about unicorns
Films set in the Middle Ages
Films set in Canada
Films set in Germany
Films set in Poland
Japanese animated fantasy films
Madhouse (company)
Osamu Tezuka anime
Osamu Tezuka characters
Osamu Tezuka manga
Sanrio characters
Shōjo manga
Television series by Televisa
1983 fantasy films